Saihan District is one of four districts of the prefecture-level city of Hohhot, the capital of Inner Mongolia Autonomous Region, China.

It was established in July 1999 and is located in the South East of the city and covers a total area of 1025.2 square kilometres. The population of the district is 572,000, 383,000 of whom live in the urban core; the remaining population live in the vast agricultural area included within the district.

The district houses the cities seat of government, and a number of important cultural sites, including the nationally protected Wanbu Huayanjing Pagoda and Baita railway station. It also houses the international airport for Hohhot, Hohhot Baita International Airport and Hohhot East railway station; one of two major railway stations in the city. The HQ for the Hohhot Metro is located near the Houbutaqi station within the district.

Administrative divisions
Saihan District has 8 subdistricts, 3 towns and 1 development district.
 Subdistricts
Renmin Road Subdistrict
()
()
()
()
()
()
()

 Towns
()
()
()

 Development district
()

References

County-level divisions of Inner Mongolia